Samuel Adams (1722–1803) was a Boston leader in the era of the American Revolution.

Samuel Adams or Sam Adams may also refer to:

Politics
Samuel Adams (Arkansas politician) (1805–1850), acting Governor of Arkansas in 1844
Sam Adams (Oregon politician) (born 1963), mayor of Portland, Oregon
Samuel Hunter Adams (1878–1975), mayor of Calgary, Alberta, Canada

Military and intelligence
Samuel Adams (Loyalist) (1730–1810), Loyalist officer in the Revolutionary War, physician, surgeon
Samuel Adams (naval officer) (1912–1942), United States naval officer
Samuel A. Adams (1934–1988), CIA analyst known for challenging official enemy troop estimates during the Vietnam War

Sports
Sam Adams (golfer) (born 1946), PGA Tour golfer
Sam Adams Sr. (1948–2015), American football player
Sam Adams (American football) (born 1973), American football player
Sam Adams (Canadian football) (1928–2015), Canadian football player
Sam Adams (footballer, born 1989), Ghanaian footballer

Other people
Samuel Adams Sr. (1689–1748), American brewer
Soren Sorensen Adams or Sam Adams (1879–1963), Danish-born American inventor of the Joy Buzzer and other novelties
Sam Adams (explorer) (1828–1915), surveyor of the American West
Samuel S. Adams (1937–2006), economic geologist
Samuel Hopkins Adams (1871–1958), American writer and investigative journalist
Samuel Adams (composer) (born 1985), American composer
Sammy Adams (born 1987), American rapper
Samuel Adams (priest) (1886–1856), Irish Anglican priest and Dean of Cashel
Samuel B. Adams (1853–1938), Supreme Court of Georgia judge

Other uses
Samuel Adams (beer), an American brand of beer
Sam Adams Award

See also 
Adams (surname)

Adams, Samuel